Chelsea Georgeson (now Chelsea Hedges) (born 15 October 1983) is an Australian surfer who won the world title in 2005. She won the title after beating Brazil's Jacqueline Silva in the final at the season-ending event at Honolua Bay, Hawaii. She started surfing at the age of 13.

References
 "Georgeson wins world title", ABC News Online.  17 December 2005.  Retrieved 25 January 2006.
 "Aussie girl new world champion", FOX Sports.  17 December 2005.  Retrieved 25 January 2006.

1983 births
World Surf League surfers
Living people
Australian female surfers